Hernán Jiménez (born 1980) is a Costa Rican film director, screenwriter, actor and stand-up comedian.

Early life and education
Jiménez was born in San José, Costa Rica. and left the country when he was 16 to attend Pearson College UWC in British Columbia, Canada. Jiménez earned a BFA in film from San Francisco Art Institute and an MFA in screenwriting and directing at Columbia University. He trained as an actor at the National Theatre School of Canada in Montreal.

Career

Stand-up comedy
Jiménez started out as a stand-up comedian in Costa Rica. He consistently performs sold-out shows at venues across Costa Rica, and has written and starred in four stand-up comedy television specials since 2012, including his latest "Se despichó Tere", which shattered attendance records locally and sold over 80,000 tickets.

Filmmaking
Jiménez's debut feature, A ojos cerrados (Eyes Closed), premiered in Costa Rica in 2010. The film is about a successful young executive who must choose between honoring her grandmother and an important work project.

With money made from his first film and his stand-up comedy act, Jimenez funded his second feature, El regreso (The Return). Jiménez wrote and directed the film and starred as Antonio, who after a decade living in New York City returns to Costa Rica for a visit and is confronted with his past. It won Best International Feature Film at the 2011 New York International Latino Film Festival, and premiered theatrically in Costa Rica in September 2011.

His follow-up, the romantic comedy Entonces nosotros (About Us), stars Jiménez as Diego, who is trying to salvage his relationship with his longtime girlfriend Sofia (Noelia Castaño). It premiered at IFF Panama in April 2016 and in theaters in Costa Rica in May 2016. It had the second-best opening weekend for a local film (by attendance) in the history of Costa Rican cinema. In October 2016, the film was selected to be the Costa Rican entry for Best Foreign Language Film at the 89th Academy Awards.

In 2017, Jiménez wrote and directed his feature film and English language debut Elsewhere, starring Parker Posey, Aden Young, Ken Jeong, Beau Bridges, Jacki Weaver and Jackie Tohn. The film was shot near Vancouver, British Columbia and premiered on January 24, 2020.

He co-wrote the upcoming biopic A Million Miles Away for Amazon Studios, based on the life of NASA astronaut José Hernández, starring Michael Peña. The project will be directed by Alejandra Márquez Abella and produced by Mark Ciardi.

Jiménez directed the Netflix romantic comedy Love Hard, starring Nina Dobrev, Jimmy O. Yang and Darren Barnett. The film premiered on November 5, 2021, and became the # 1 movie on the platform worldwide. The film is produced by Mary Viola and McG under their banner Wonderland Sound and Vision.

Filmography

Feature films

Short films

Stand-up specials

References

External links
 Official website
 

Living people
1980 births
Spanish-language film directors
Costa Rican male film actors
Costa Rican film directors
Male actors from San José, Costa Rica
Writers from San José, Costa Rica
Costa Rican stand-up comedians
People educated at a United World College
San Francisco Art Institute alumni
National Theatre School of Canada alumni
Columbia University School of the Arts alumni